Yaser Salem Salah Ali (born 5 December 1977) is an Emirati retired footballer who played as a forward for Emirati clubs Al Wahda and Baniyas. He earned 36 caps for the United Arab Emirates national team, scoring 16 goals. Ali scored 10 goals in the 2002 FIFA World Cup qualifying campaign and also appeared at the 1997 FIFA Confederations Cup.

References

Living people
1977 births
Emirati footballers
Association football forwards
Al Wahda FC players
Baniyas Club players
UAE Pro League players
United Arab Emirates international footballers
1997 FIFA Confederations Cup players